DYMB-TV, channel 36 (analog) and channel 18 (digital), is a local commercial television station of Philippine television network TV5, owned by its sister company Cignal TV, Inc., It is the first UHF station affiliate by a major network in Iloilo City, Philippines. Its studio is located at Magsaysay Road, La Paz, Iloilo City, and its 10,000-watt transmitter is located at Piña-Tamborong-Alaguisoc Road, Jordan, Guimaras.

TV5 Iloilo History 
 1967 - Associated Broadcasting Corporation opened its broadcast in Jaro, Iloilo City via Channel 6 (DYXX-TV), which was the first television station in the whole Panay, until 1972 when President Ferdinand Marcos declared Martial Law and it was forced to shut down. The Channel 6 frequency would eventually handed over to GMA Network, through Asian-Pacific Broadcasting Company in 1974.
 August 9, 2008 - TV5 started its official broadcast in Iloilo City (with the change of its callsign to DYER-TV on UHF Channel 46), following ABC-5's closure prior to signed off on August 8 which aired a countdown to its re-launch for much of the next day until 19:00 PHT, when the network officially re-launched under its new name of the same network.
 April 4, 2010 - TV5 Iloilo was reformatted, with a new lineup of programming and branding as the "Kapatid" ("sibling") network.
 July 2012 - TV5 Iloilo switched its channel assignment from Channel 46 to Channel 36; the former frequency was given to the newly launched AksyonTV.
 February 17, 2018 - as the recent changes within the network and in celebration of its 10th anniversary, TV5 Iloilo was relaunched as The 5 Network Iloilo with a new logo and station ID entitled Get It on 5 whereas the TV on the northeastern quadrant of the logo has been dropped, making it more flexible for the other divisions to use it as part of their own identity.
 January 13, 2019 - 5 Iloilo introduced a variation of the current numerical 5 logo, similar to the newly network 5 Plus.
 August 15, 2020 - 5 Iloilo was reverted to TV5 while retaining the 2019 numerical 5 logo.
July 14, 2021 - TV5 Iloilo started its digital test broadcasts on UHF Channel 18 covering Metro Iloilo, Metro Bacolod and the provinces of Iloilo and Guimaras, as well as several parts of Negros Occidental.

Digital television

Digital channels

UHF Channel 18 (497.143 MHz)

Areas of coverage

Primary areas  
 Iloilo
 Guimaras

Secondary areas 
 Portion of Negros Occidental

TV5 television and radio stations nationwide

References

External links 
 Official Site

Television stations in Iloilo City
TV5 (Philippine TV network) stations
Television channels and stations established in 2008
2008 establishments in the Philippines
Digital television stations in the Philippines